Udupi district (also Udipi or Odipu in Tulu language) is an   administrative subdivision in the  Karnataka state of India, with the district headquarters in the city of Udupi. It is situated in the Canara old north malabar coastal region, there are seven taluks, 233 villages and 21 towns in Udupi district. The three northern tehsils of Udupi, Kundapur and Karkala, were partitioned from Dakshina Kannada district (South Canara) to form Udupi district on 25 August 1997. Moodabidri was officially declared as new tehsil (taluk), separated from Karkala with effect from 11 January 2018.

In February 2018, the district was split to into 3 more taluks, with Byndoor being carved out of Kundapur taluk and the Udupi taluk being split into three parts. Along with the initial Udupi taluk, Kapu, Brahmavar and Hebri were created.

Dinakar Babu and Sheela K Shetty of the Bharatiya Janata Party (BJP) are the current president (Sarpanch) and vice-president of the Udupi Zilla Panchayat, respectively, after the election held at the Zilla Panchayat on 27 April 2016.

Location 
Udupi district is surrounded by Uttara Kannada district in north, Dakshina Kannada district in southern direction. Shimoga district borders on north east side and Chikmagalur district on east. Arabian sea is on west of Udupi district.

Transportation
Udupi district is connected by road and railway line. The National highway 66 (previously NH-17) is the main highway road of Udupi district. National highway 169A connects this district with Thirthahalli in Shivamogga district but it is very narrow at many places and only mini buses and mini lorries are allowed on Agumbe ghat through which this national highway 169A passes. The national highway 169 (previously NH 13) from Mangaluru to Shivamogga passes through Sanoor, Karkala, Bajagoli, Mudar of this district. There are few state highways(SH) built and maintained by Karnataka public works department (P.W.D.). Main District Roads (M.D.R) connect villages and towns of the district.

Konkan Railway connects Udupi with Goa, Maharshtra and Kerala states.  Udupi, Byndoor, Kundapura, Barkur,  Innanje, and Padubidre are few railway stations on Konkan railway line. There are trains from Udupi to state capital Bangalore, Mangalore, Kasaragod, Margao, Thane and Mumbai.

Demographics
According to the 2011 census Udupi district has a population of 1,177,361. This gives it a ranking of 403rd in India (out of a total of 640). Its population growth rate over the decade 2001-2011 was 5.9%.

The sex-ratio of Udupi district is around 1094 compared to 973 which is average of Karnataka state. The literacy rate of Udupi district is 78.69% out of which 82.85% males are literate and 74.89% females are literate.

Out of the total population, 71.63% of the population lives in the Urban area and 28.37% lives in Rural area.

Udupi has a sex ratio of 1093 females for every 1000 males, and a literacy rate of 86.29%. About 28% of the population lives in the urban areas. Scheduled Castes and Scheduled Tribes make up 6.41% and 4.49% of the population respectively.
At the time of the 2011 census, 42.70% of the population spoke Kannada, 31.44% Tulu, 12.16% Konkani, 4.61% Urdu, 2.83% Marathi, 2.13% Malayalam and 2.01% Beary as their first language.

Climate
Udupi has a tropical climate.

Udupi had record rainfall during September 2020, with mass floods following soon after. The district received 315.3 mm rainfall which is a record in Udupi taluk during the last 40 years.

Commerce and industry 
A thermal power plant has been set up at Nandikoor in Udupi district, with installed capacity of 1200 MW and a further 1600 MW proposed.

Suzlon has a manufacturing facility at Padubidre for making blades for wind mills. The project has been mired in controversies, with the company announcing a lock-out in November 2017 that lasted for more than a month. Activities were again suspended in July 2018.

A strategic petroleum reserve is set up at an underground location in the village of Padur ( Padoor ) village in the Udupi district.

At Shivalli Industrial Estate in Manipal a few small scale industries have set up factories. There are few clay roof tiles (Mangalore tiles) industry, Cashew nut processing industry, Coconut oil mills and fish meal industry in Udupi district.  There are many small entrepreneurs who make Pickles, Happala ( Pappad ), Spices powder and other food products in this district. Prior to nationalisation of commercial banks and insurance companies in early 1960s the district had many private banks and insurance companies. Syndicate Bank, Corporation Bank and Canara Bank had genesis in this district ( then South Kanara district ) before independence of India from British in 1947 A.D.

Notable people 

 
 

 V. S. Acharya
 Ravi Basrur
 Siddharth Basrur
 K. Raghupati Bhat
 Guru Dutt
 Oscar Fernandes
 Harini
 K. Jayaprakash Hegde
 N. Santosh Hegde
 Pooja Hegde
 K. Shivaram Karanth
 V. Sunil Kumar
 Pramod Madhwaraj
 Veerappa Moily
 Deepika Padukone
 Prakash Padukone
 Ramdas Pai
 T. M. A. Pai
 Kota Srinivas Poojary
 Vinaya Prasad
 Udupi Ramachandra Rao
 Ravi Shastri
 B. R. Shetty
 Dayanand Shetty
 Raj Shetty
 Rakshit Shetty
 Rishab Shetty
 Kashinath (actor)
 Upendra
 B. Vittalacharya

See also 
 List of villages in Udupi district
Udupi cuisine
 Kere Basadi
South Kanara (North) (Lok Sabha constituency)
South Kanara (South) (Lok Sabha constituency)
Kukkikatte
Bankerkatta
Kuthpady
Malpe
Tonse
St. Mary's Islands
Udyavara
Yenagudde

References

Further reading

External links 

 Official Website of Udupi district

 
Districts of Karnataka
1997 establishments in Karnataka

kn:ಉಡುಪಿ